Abdel Fattah Saeed Hussein Khalil el-Sisi (born 19 November 1954) is an Egyptian politician and retired military officer who has served as the sixth and current president of Egypt since 2014. Before retiring as a general in the Egyptian military in 2014, Sisi served as Egypt’s deputy prime minister from 2013 to 2014, as its minister of defense from 2012 to 2013, and as its director of military intelligence from 2010 to 2012. He was promoted to the rank of Field Marshal in January 2014.

Sisi was born in Cairo in 1954. As a young man, he joined the Egyptian Army and held a post in Saudi Arabia before enrolling in the Egyptian Army's Command and Staff College. Sisi received additional training at the Joint Services Command and Staff College in the United Kingdom in 1992, and at the United States Army War College in Carlisle, Pennsylvania, in 2006. Before becoming director of military intelligence in 2010, he served as a mechanized infantry commander. He never saw active combat throughout his military service.

After the Egyptian revolution of 2011 and election of Mohamed Morsi to the Egyptian presidency, Sisi was appointed Minister of Defense by Morsi on 12 August 2012, replacing the Hosni Mubarak-era Hussein Tantawi. As the minister of defense, and ultimately commander in chief of the Egyptian Armed Forces, Sisi was involved in the military coup that removed then-president Morsi from office on 3 July 2013, in response to the June 2013 Egyptian protests. Morsi was replaced by an interim president, Adly Mansour, who appointed a new cabinet. Demonstrations, sit-ins, and violent clashes between supporters of Morsi and security forces followed, culminating in the Rabaa massacre.

On 26 March 2014, in response to calls from supporters to run for the presidency, Field Marshal el-Sisi retired from his military career and announced that he would run as a candidate in the 2014 presidential election. The election, held between 26 and 28 May, featured one opponent, Hamdeen Sabahi, saw 47% participation by eligible voters, and resulted in Sisi winning in a landslide victory with 97% of the vote. Sisi was sworn into office as President of Egypt on 8 June 2014.

Sisi rules an authoritarian regime in Egypt, and some elements of his rule have been described as even more strict than that of prior authoritarian leader Mubarak. In the 2018 presidential election, Sisi faced only nominal opposition (a pro-government supporter, Moussa Mostafa Moussa) after the military arrest of Sami Anan, threats made to Ahmed Shafik with old corruption charges and an alleged sex tape, and the withdrawal of Khaled Ali and Mohamed Anwar El-Sadat due to the overwhelming obstacles presented, and violations committed, by the elections committee.

Early life and military education
Sisi was born in Old Cairo on 19 November 1954 to Said Hussein Khalili al-Sisi and Soad Mohamed, both from Monufia Governorate. He grew up in Gamaleya, near al-Azhar Mosque, in a quarter where Muslims, Jews and Christians resided and in which he later recalled how, during his childhood, he had heard church bells and watched Jews flock to synagogue unhindered.

He later enrolled in the Egyptian Military Academy, and upon graduating he held various command positions in the Egyptian Armed Forces and served as Egypt's military attaché in Riyadh. In 1987, he attended the Egyptian Command and Staff College. In 1992, he continued his military career by enrolling in the British Command and Staff College, and, in 2006, enrolled in the United States Army War College in Carlisle, Pennsylvania. Sisi was the youngest member of the Supreme Council of the Armed Forces (SCAF) during the Egyptian Revolution of 2011, serving as the director of military intelligence and reconnaissance department. He was later chosen to replace Mohamed Hussein Tantawi and serve as the commander-in-chief and Minister of Defense and Military Production on 12 August 2012.

Sisi's family origins were in the Monufia Governorate. He is the second eldest of eight siblings. His father, a conservative but not radical Muslim, who later had six additional children with a second wife, owned an antiques shop for tourists in the historic bazaar of Khan el-Khalili.

Sisi and his siblings studied at the nearby library at al-Azhar University. Unlike his brothers – one of whom is a senior judge, another a civil servant – el-Sisi went to a local army-run secondary school, where he developed a relationship with his maternal cousin, Entissar Amer. They were married upon Sisi's graduation from the Egyptian Military Academy in 1977. He attended the following courses:
General Command and Staff Course, Egyptian Command and Staff College, 1987;
General Command and Staff Course, Joint Command and Staff College, United Kingdom, 1992;
War Course, Fellowship of the Higher War College, Nasser Military Academy, Egypt, 2003;
War Course, United States Army War College, United States, 2006;
Egyptian Armed Forces military attaché in Riyadh, Saudi Arabia;
Basic Infantry Course, United States

Military career, 1977–2014
El-Sisi received his commission as a military officer in 1977 serving in the mechanised infantry, specialising in anti-tank warfare and mortar warfare. He became Commander of the Northern Military Region-Alexandria in 2008 and then Director of Military Intelligence and Reconnaissance. El-Sisi was the youngest member of the Supreme Council of the Armed Forces of Egypt. While a member of the Supreme Council, he made controversial statements regarding allegations that Egyptian soldiers had subjected detained female demonstrators to forced virginity tests. He is reported to have told Egypt's state-owned newspaper that "the virginity-test procedure was done to protect the girls from rape as well as to protect the soldiers and officers from rape accusations." He was the first member of the Supreme Council of the Armed Forces to admit that the invasive tests had been carried out.

Main command positions
Commander, 509th Mechanized Infantry Battalion
Chief of Staff, 134th Mechanized Infantry Brigade
Commander, 16th Mechanized Infantry Brigade
Chief of Staff, 2nd Mechanized Infantry Division
Chief of Staff, Northern Military Zone
Deputy Director, Military Intelligence and Reconnaissance Department
Director, Military Intelligence and Reconnaissance Department

Also reported is commander of the 23rd Mechanized Division, Third Field Army.

Minister of Defense

On 12 August 2012, Egyptian President Mohamed Morsi made a decision to replace the Mubarak-era Field Marshal Mohamed Hussein Tantawi, the head of the Egyptian Armed Forces, with then little-known el-Sisi. He also promoted him to the rank of colonel general. Sisi was then described by the official website of FJP as a "Defense minister with revolutionary taste". El-Sisi also took the post of Minister of Defense and Military Production in the Qandil Cabinet.

El-Sisi was appointed as Minister of Defense on 12 August 2012. He remained in office under the new government formed after the deposition of Morsi, and led by Hazem al-Beblawi. He was also appointed Deputy Prime Minister of Egypt. On 27 January 2014, he was promoted to the rank of field marshal.

Civil uprising, coup d'état and transition

Mass demonstrations occurred on 30 June 2013 as Egyptians took to the streets to denounce Mohamed Morsi. Clashes took place around Egypt. Soon afterwards, the Egyptian Army issued a 48-hour ultimatum which aired on television that gave the country's political parties until 3 July to meet the demands of the anti-Morsi demonstrators. The Egyptian military also threatened to intervene if the dispute was not resolved by then.
On 3 July 2013, the Egyptian Armed Forces declared that as the political parties had failed to meet the deadline and Morsi had failed to build a national consensus for his leadership, the army had to overthrow Morsi in a coup d'état. The army then installed the Chief Justice of the Supreme Constitutional Court Adly Mansour as the interim head of state in his place until a new president could be elected, and ordered the arrest of many members of the Muslim Brotherhood on charges of "inciting violence and disturbing general security and peace." El-Sisi announced on television that the president had "failed to meet the demands of the Egyptian people" and declared that the constitution would be temporarily suspended, which was met by acceptance from anti-Morsi demonstrations and condemnation from pro-Morsi supporters in Rabaa al-Adawiya.

On 24 July 2013, during a speech at a military parade, el-Sisi called for mass demonstrations to grant the Egyptian military and police a "mandate" to crack down on terrorism. While supporters interpreted this to mean that el-Sisi felt the need of the people to prove to the world that it was not a coup but the popular will, the statement was seen by opponents as contradicting the military's pledges to hand over power to civilians after removing Morsi and as indicating an imminent crackdown against Islamists.

The reactions to el-Sisi's announcement ranged from open support from the Egyptian presidency and the Tamarod movement to rejection, not only by the Muslim Brotherhood, but also by the Salafi Nour Party, the Islamist Strong Egypt Party, the liberal April 6 Youth Movement and some western-backed human rights groups.
During the August 2013 Cairo sit-ins dispersal, the Egyptian military under el-Sisi's command was involved in assisting the national police in dispersing two sit-ins held by Muslim Brotherhood/Morsi supporters from sit-ins in Rabaa el-Adaweya and Nahda squares. This action resulted in rapidly escalating violence that eventually led to deaths of 638 people, of whom 595 were protestors and 43 were security forces, with at least 3,994 injured from both sides (according to the Ministry of Health). In addition to several violent incidents in various cities including Menya and Kerdasa against security forces which resulted in the Kerdasa massacre. Writing for British newspaper The Independent in August 2013, Robert Fisk described then-General el-Sisi as being at a loss, but that a massacre - as Fisk called the sit-in dispersal - would go down in history as an infamy. Writing for the American magazine Time, Lee Smith concluded that "Egypt's new leader is unfit to rule", referring not to the actual head of government at the time, interim president Adly Mansour, but to Sisi. In a file published by the State Information Services, the government explained the raids by stating that "police went on to use force dispersing the sit-in on 14 August 2013 with the least possible damage, causing hundreds of civilians and police to fall as victims, while Muslim Brotherhood supporters imposed a blockade for 46 days against the people in al-Nahda and Rabaa al-Adawiya squares under the name of sit-in where tens of protesters took to the street daily hindered the lives of the Egyptians, causing unrest and the death or injury of many victims as well as damage to public and private properties".

On 3 August 2013, el-Sisi gave his first interview since the overthrow of President Mohamed Morsi. Speaking to The Washington Post, he criticised the US response and accused the Obama administration of disregarding the Egyptian popular will and of providing insufficient support amid threats of a civil war, saying, "You left the Egyptians. You turned your back on the Egyptians and they won't forget that."

On 6 October war anniversary in 2013, el-Sisi announced that the army was committed to the popular mandate of 26 July 2013: "We are committed, in front of God, to the Egyptian and Arab people that we will protect Egypt, the Egyptians and their free will."During the anniversary celebration that year, General el-Sisi invited the Emirati, Iraqi, Bahraini, Moroccan and Jordanian defense ministers to celebrate with him. During his speech he said in a warning way that the Egyptian people "will never forget who stood with them or against them". El-Sisi described 6 October as "a day to celebrate for all Arabs", hoping for the "unification of Arabs". He also thanked "Egypt's Arab brothers, who stood by its side." El-Sisi commented on the relationship between the Egyptian army and Egyptian people, saying that it is hard to break. El-Sisi said: "We would die before you [the Egyptian people] would feel pain". He also compared the Egyptian army to the Pyramid, saying that "it cannot be broken".

Civil liberties
After Sisi had ousted president Morsi and disbanded the Shura Council, in September 2013 interim president Adly Mansour temporarily decreed that ministers could award contracts without a request for tender. In the next month, the government awarded building contracts worth approximately one billion dollars to the Egyptian Army. In April 2014, the interim government's Investment Law banned appeals against government contracts.

Also in September 2013, the interim government removed pre-trial detention limits for certain crimes, allowing unconvicted political dissidents to remain in detention indefinitely. In November 2013, el-Sisi's government banned protests in an attempt to combat the growing pro-Brotherhood unrest; the police arrested thousands of Egyptians using the new law.

On 24 March 2014, an Egyptian court sentenced 529 members of the Muslim Brotherhood to death, following an attack on a police station in 2013, an act described by Amnesty International as "the largest single batch of simultaneous death sentences we've seen in recent years […] anywhere in the world". The BBC reported that by May 2016, approximately 40,000 people, mostly Brotherhood members or loyalists, had been imprisoned since Morsi's overthrow.

Cult of personality
The anti-Morsi demonstrators on the streets welcomed el-Sisi's announcement of the overthrow of Morsi with celebrations and carried posters of el-Sisi, chanting "The Army and the People are one hand" and supporting General el-Sisi. On social networks, thousands of Egyptians changed their profile pictures to pictures of el-Sisi, while others started campaigns requesting that El-Sisi be promoted to the rank of field marshal, while others hoped he would be nominated in the next presidential elections.

Cupcakes, chocolate and necklaces bearing the "CC" initials were created, restaurants in Egypt named sandwiches after him, blogs shared his pictures, and columns, op-eds, television shows and interviews discussed the "new idol of the Nile valley" in the Egyptian mainstream media. On 6 December 2013, el-Sisi was named "Time Person of the Year" in Time magazine's annual reader poll. The accompanying article noted "Sisi's success reflected the genuine popularity of a man who led what was essentially a military coup in July against the democratically elected government of then President Mohammed Morsi."

The "Kamel Gemilak" (Finish Your Favor) and "El-Sisi for President" campaigns were started to gather signatures to press el-Sisi, who had said he had no desire to govern, to run for presidency. Many politicians and parties including Egyptians and non-Egyptians had announced their support for el-Sisi in the event of his running for president, including the National Salvation Front, Tamarod, Amr Moussa, a previous candidate for the presidency, Abdel-Hakim Abdel-Nasser son of late President Gamal Abdel Nasser, unsuccessful presidential candidate Ahmed Shafik, Prime Minister Hazem Al Beblawi, Naguib Sawiris, the Free Egyptians Party, the Revolutionary Forces Bloc, and the Russian president Vladimir Putin. However, Hamdeen Sabahi ran against him in the presidential race. Subsequently, Sabahi issued criticisms of Sisi and his candidacy by expressing doubt about Sisi's commitment to democracy, arguing that the general bears a measure of direct and indirect responsibility for the human rights violations carried out during the period of the interim government. He also denounced what he deemed to be the transitional government's hostility toward the goals of the revolution.

Kamel Gemilak claimed to have collected 26 million signatures asking Sisi to run for president. On 21 January 2014, Kamel Gemilak organised a mass conference call in Cairo International Stadium to call on el-Sisi to run for president. On 6 February 2014, the Kuwaiti newspaper al-Seyassah claimed that el-Sisi would run for president, saying that he had to meet the wishes of the Egyptian people for him to run. El-Sisi confirmed on 26 March 2014 that he would run for president in the presidential election. Shortly after his announcement, popular hashtags were started for and against el-Sisi's presidential bid. The presidential election, which took place between 26 and 28 May 2014, saw el-Sisi win 96 percent of votes counted; it was held without the participation of the Muslim Brotherhood's Freedom & Justice Party, which had won every prior post-Mubarak electoral contest.

Presidency (2014–present)
President Sisi was sworn into office on 8 June 2014. The event was marked by an impromptu public holiday in Egypt in conjunction with festivals held nationwide. Tahrir Square was prepared to receive millions of Egyptians celebrating Sisi's win; police and soldiers shut down the square outlets with barbed wires and barricades, as well as electronic portals for detecting any explosives that could spoil the festivities. Sisi's oath of office was administered in the morning in Egypt's Supreme constitutional court in front of the deputy head of the constitutional court, Maher Sami, who described el-Sisi as a "rebel soldier" and a "revolutionary hero"; ex-president Adly Mansour; other constitutional court members; and a group of Egypt's top politicians. Sisi later moved to the Heliopolis Palace, where a 21-gun salute welcomed the new president, before the ex-president received Sisi near the palace's stairway. Sisi then presided over a reception for the foreign presidents, emirs, kings, and official delegations who had been invited. No representatives of Turkey, Tunisia or Qatar were invited, reportedly because of their governments' critical stances regarding then-recent events in Egypt; representatives of Israel were also not invited. In a ceremony at Heliopolis Palace, Sisi gave a speech to the attendees. He and the previous president, Adly Mansour, also signed a document officially transferring power to Sisi, which was the first time in Egyptian history that power had been transferred in this way. Sisi then went on to Koubbeh Palace, where the final ceremony was held. There, he gave the final speech of the day to 1,200 attendees representing a spectrum of the Egyptian people—from various walks of life and from each of the provinces of Egypt. He described the problems that he said Egypt was facing, and his plan for addressing them, and declared, "In its next phase, Egypt will witness a total rise on both internal and external fronts, to compensate for what we have missed and correct the mistakes of the past". Sisi then issued his first presidential decree, conferring the Order of the Nile upon the previous president, Adly Mansour.

Domestic policy

According to Freedom House, President Abdel Fattah al-Sisi has governed Egypt in an increasingly authoritarian manner. They claim that meaningful political opposition is virtually nonexistent and that security forces engage in human rights abuses with impunity.

Sisi has expressed his personal concerns about the issue of sexual assault in the country. He was photographed during a hospital visit to a woman receiving treatment after an assault during celebrations in Cairo's Tahrir Square, ordering the army, the police, and the media to counter the issue.

El-Sisi has called for the reform and modernisation of Islam; to that end, he has taken measures within Egypt such as regulating mosque sermons and changing school textbooks (including the removal of some content on Saladin and Uqba ibn Nafi inciting or glorifying hatred and violence). He has also called for an end to the Islamic verbal divorce; however, this was rejected by a council of scholars from Al-Azhar University.

El-Sisi also became the first Egyptian president in the country's history to attend Christmas Mass and gave a speech at the Coptic Orthodox Christmas service in Cairo in January 2015 calling for unity and wishing the Christians a merry Christmas.

Human rights policy

According to Human Rights Watch, Sisi's government used torture and enforced disappearances against his political opponents and criminal suspects. Extrajudicial killings were committed by the military in its campaign against Wilayah Sayna, an ISIS affiliate in North Sinai. In addition to prosecutions, travel bans and asset freezes against human rights defenders, and repressive new legislations that threaten to kill the independent civil society. The government is also responsible for arbitrary arrests and torture of children as young as twelve.

Mass demonstrations against his government broke out on 20 September 2019, protesting perceived corruption, repression and lack of freedom. Sisi blamed political Islam for protests and instability. According to him, "As long as we have political Islam movements that aspire for power, our region will remain in a state of instability." Sisi stated that public opinion in Egypt would not accept political Islam to return to government, referring to 30 June 2013 uprising and coup d'état against the Muslim Brotherhood rule.

Economic reforms

Sisi, who is reportedly facing a severe economic ordeal in Egypt, has decided to raise fuel prices by 78 percent as an introduction to cut the subsidies on basic food stuffs and energy, which eat up nearly a quarter of the state budget. The Egyptian government has always provided these subsidies as a crucial aid to millions of people who live in poverty, fearing people's anger in five years time. Egypt has spent $96 billion on energy subsidies in a decade which made petrol in Egypt among the world's cheapest. Cutting the energy subsidies will save £E51 billion. The government hopes the decision will benefit services such as health and education. Sisi also raised taxes on alcohol and cigarettes, applying a flat tax on local and imported cigarettes to between 25 and 40 cents per pack, as well as new property taxes, and plans to introduce a new scheme for value-added taxes. Chicken prices would reportedly rise by 25 percent days after the decision because of added transportation costs. Mini-bus and taxi fares were raised by about 13 percent. Slashing subsidies was recommended by international financial institutions, but no Egyptian leader had managed to broach the issue, fearing unrest in a country where nearly 30 percent of the population live in poverty and rely on government aid. President Sisi defended the decision to raise fuel prices, saying it was "bitter medicine" that should have been taken before and was "50 years late" but was not taken, as governments feared a backlash like the Bread Riots of 1977. Sisi, who had previously accepted only half of his own pay, called on Egyptians to make sacrifices, vowing to repair an economy growing at the slowest pace in two decades. Sisi warned Egyptians of more pain over the next two years from economic problems that he said had accumulated over the last four decades and needed to be fixed. Egypt also paid more than $6 billion it owed to foreign oil companies within two months. By March 2015 after 8 months of Sisi's rule, Egypt's external debt fell to $39.9 billion, a drop of 13.5 percent.

As a result of the economic reforms, Moody's raised Egypt's credit ratings outlook to stable from negative and Fitch Ratings upgraded Egypt's credit rating one step to "B" from "B−". Standard & Poor's rated Egypt B-minus with a stable outlook and upgraded Egypt's credit rating in November 2013. On 7 April 2015, Moody's upgraded Egypt's outlook from Caa1 to B3 with stable outlook expecting real GDP growth in Egypt to recover to 4.5% year-on-year for the fiscal year 2015, which ends in June, and then to rise to around 5%–6% over the coming four years compared to 2.5% in 2014.

In May 2015, Egypt chose the banks to handle its return to the international bond market after a gap of five years marking a return of economic and political stability in the country after the revolution of 2011. However, in early 2016 the Egyptian pound suffered from devaluation: in February when the pound was allowed to float briefly, its value reduced rapidly from £E7.83 per US dollar to £E8.95 per dollar, resulting in increased prices for everyday goods.

Energy policy
Considered its worst in decades, Egypt's energy crisis that helped inflame the protests against former president Mohamed Morsi continued to grow in Sisi's first months in office, challenging the new government. Due to shortage in energy production, growing consumption, terrorist attacks on Egypt's energy infrastructure, debts to foreign oil companies and the absence of the needed periodic maintenance of the power plants, the energy blackout rates in Egypt rose to unprecedented levels, with some parts of the country facing around six power cuts a day for up to two hours each. In August 2014, daily electricity consumption hit a record high of 27.7 gigawatts, 20% more power than stations could provide. The next month Egypt suffered a massive power outage that halted parts of the Cairo Metro, took television stations off the air, and ground much of the country to a halt for several hours because of the sudden loss of 50 percent of the country's power generation. Sisi, on his part, said that the idler would be held accountable and promised to partially solve the economic crisis by August 2015, and that, beginning with December that year, the crisis will be dealt with entirely. Both long-term and short-term plans were introduced. In the short-term, Egypt signed a contract with General Electric (GE) to provide the country with 2.6 gigawatts by the summer of 2015. The first phase entered service in June and the final phase was expected to be completed by the end of August, making it one of the fastest energy transferring operations in the world according to GE. In June, Sisi's administration stated that for the first time in years, Egypt achieved a surplus in power generating capacity estimated at 2.9 gigawatts. In the long-term, Egypt paid more than $6 billion it owed to foreign oil companies between January and March. Energy contracts were placed as a top priority in the Egypt Economic Development Conference in March 2015, resulting in a $9 billion contract with Siemens to supply gas and wind power plants to boost the country's electricity generation by 50 percent, in addition to an energy deal worth $12 billion (£E91.5 billion) with BP to provide the country with an extra quarter of local energy production. Sisi also stated that Egypt is not just solving its energy crisis, but rather seeking to become a "global hub for energy trading." In Nicosia on 21 November 2017 he met  President of Cyprus Nicos Anastasiades and the Prime Minister of Greece Alexis Tsipras.

National projects
In August 2014, President Sisi initiated a new Suez Canal, a parallel channel running about one-third the length of the existing waterway, which would double capacity of the existing canal from 49 to 97 ships a day. The new canal is expected to increase the Suez Canal's revenues by 259% from current annual revenues of $5 billion. The project cost around 60 billion Egyptian-pounds ($8.4 billion) and was fast-tracked over a year. Sisi insisted funding come from Egyptian sources only. The new canal was inaugurated on schedule on 6 August 2015.

Sisi also introduced the Suez Canal Area Development Project which would involve development of five new seaports in the three provinces surrounding the canal, a new industrial zone west of the Gulf of Suez, economic zones around the waterway, seven new tunnels between Sinai and the Egyptian home land, building a new Ismailia city, huge fish farms, and a technology valley within Ismailia.

Sisi also started the National Roads Project, which involves building a road network of more than 4,400 kilometres and uses 104 acres of land, promising that there are many development and reconstruction campaigns for Egypt to reduce the unemployment rate and increase the poor's income.

An ambitious plan to build a new city near Cairo to serve as the country's new capital was announced during the Egypt Economic Development Conference. Located east of Cairo approximately midway between Cairo and Suez, this proposed new capital of Egypt is yet to be formally named and is intended to relieve population pressures from the greater Cairo area

President Sisi has set a national goal of eliminating all unsafe slums in two years. The first stage of the project was inaugurated on 30 May 2016 containing 11,000 housing units built at a cost of £E1.56 billion (US$177.8 Million). Funding was provided by the "Long Live Egypt" economic development fund in collaboration with civilian charitable organizations. The ultimate goal is the construction of 850,000 housing units with additional stages in processes funded in the same manner.

An agricultural plan, under the name "New Delta Project", aims to expand the Egyptian Delta and construct housing and farmlands westwards to increase Egypt's food sufficiency and general agricultural production.

Opinion polls

In August 2014, Egypt's Baseera, the Centre for Public Opinion Research, said in a poll result that only eight percent of the sample were unhappy with El-Sisi's performance and ten percent of the sample said they could not identify their position. The poll showed that 78 percent of the sample said they would vote for Sisi should the presidential elections be held again the next day while 11 percent said they would not. Eighty-nine percent said that there was improvement in the security situation after Sisi's taking office. Seventy-three percent said that fuel has become regularly available since Sisi's election. Meanwhile, 35 percent of respondents believed price controls had improved, while 32 percent believed that they have become worse. Twenty-nine percent of the respondents did not see any change, and three percent were undecided.

An April 2016 poll by Baseera after 22 months in office, indicated that Sisi garnered 79% approval rating while 8% were undecided and 13% disapprove of the president's performance. These numbers indicate a moderate drop from the last poll done in 2014.

In October 2016, Baseera conducted a poll that reports 68% of respondents claim to support Sisi, a 14% fall from the last poll created in August, and it included that the reason for the fall was the ongoing price hikes.

According to an October 2016 survey fielded by Princeton University scholars found that "roughly 58% of respondents hold positive implicit attitudes toward Sisi."

Foreign policy

Africa
El-Sisi made an African tour, his first foreign visit since taking office a short visit to Algeria, seeking support to counter Islamist militancy in North Africa. Shortly before Sisi arrived in Malabo, Equatorial Guinea to participate in the 23rd ordinary session of the African Union summit where he gave his speech blaming the AU for freezing Egypt's membership a year before. El-Sisi also announced the establishment of an Egyptian partnership agency for Africa's development. He also concluded the tour with a few hours' visit to Sudan.

The dispute between Egypt and Ethiopia over the Grand Ethiopian Renaissance Dam escalated in 2021. El-Sisi warned: "I am telling our brothers in Ethiopia, let's not reach the point where you touch a drop of Egypt's water, because all options are open."

Israel and Palestine

Relations with Israel have improved significantly following Mohamed Morsi's removal, with Sisi saying he talked to Israel's former prime minister, Benjamin Netanyahu, "a lot". Sisi has been described by The Economist as "the most pro-Israeli Egyptian leader ever." With continuous support for Palestine, the Sisi administration supports the two-state solution establishing a Palestinian state on lands that were occupied in 1967  with Eastern Jerusalem as its capital for the Israeli–Palestinian conflict achieving the Palestinians needs and granting Israel the security it wants. The first months of Sisi's presidency witnessed the 2014 Israel–Gaza conflict. Egypt also criticised the IDF operation in the Gaza Strip as "oppressive policies of mass punishment rejecting 'the irresponsible Israeli escalation' in the occupied Palestinian territory, which comes in the form of 'excessive' and unnecessary use of military force leading to the death of innocent civilians." It also demanded Israel adopt self-restraint and to keep in mind that being an "occupation force", it has a legal and moral duty to protect civilian lives.

After Egypt proposed an initiative for a ceasefire later accepted by Israel and rejected by Hamas, the Sisi administration urged the world to intervene and stop the crisis when it stated that its ceasefire efforts have been met with "obstinacy and stubbornness". Egypt also hosted several meetings with both Israeli and Palestinian officials in Cairo to mediate a ceasefire. President Sisi also ordered the Egyptian Armed Forces to transport 500 tons of aid, consisting of food and medical supplies, to Palestinians in the Gaza Strip. A statement was also released by the military saying that Egypt is pursuing its efforts to "stop the Israeli aggression on the Gaza Strip" under the president's supervision. The conflict ended with an Egyptian-brokered ceasefire on 26 August 2014. Egypt also hosted the international donor conference in Cairo aiming to raise 4 billion (3.2 billion euros) to reconstruct the Gaza Strip. Sisi described the 2014 Israel–Gaza conflict as a great chance to end the 66-year-old conflict calling on Israel to reach a peace deal with the Palestinians and saying "I call on the Israeli people and the government: now is the time to end the conflict ... so that prosperity prevails, so that we all can have peace and security". Sisi mainly blames the Israeli–Palestinian conflict for the extremism in the Middle East describing it as a "fertile environment for the growth and spread of extremism, violence and terrorism". Sisi also promised that Egypt would guarantee Palestine would not violate the peace treaty when reached expressing Egypt's willingness to deploy Egyptian observer forces in the Palestinian Authority in the West Bank and Gaza Strip.

Sisi also stipulated that the Palestinian Authority would take power in the Gaza Strip in future peace plans and conditioned an easing of transit restrictions at the Rafah checkpoint on the presence of a force from the Palestinian Authority's Presidential Guard being stationed on the Gaza side of the crossing as the Sisi administration considers Hamas an enemy, blaming them for the killing of 16 Egyptian soldiers in 2012 and over the alleged involvement in the prisons' storming in the wake of Egyptian Revolution of 2011.

In January 2020, in response to the Trump peace plan, the Sisi government issued a statement stating that it "recogniz[ed] the importance of considering the U.S. administration's initiative", that it "call[ed] on the two relevant parties to undertake a careful and thorough consideration of the U.S. vision to achieve peace" and supporting the "restor[ation] to the Palestinian people [of] their full legitimate rights through the establishment of a sovereign independent state in the Palestinian occupied territories in accordance with international legitimacy and resolutions". Egypt's stance was different to those of Jordan, Syria and Lebanon, which all opposed the plan in January 2020.

Sisi welcomed the Trump-brokered Israel–United Arab Emirates peace agreement, saying he was gladdened by the suspension of Israel's plans to annex parts of the occupied Palestinian territories in the West Bank. He also personally congratulated the Emirate of Abu Dhabi's Crown Prince Mohammed bin Zayed Al Nahyan on the deal.

On 22 March 2022, Sisi met with Mohamed bin Zayed Al Nahyan and Israeli Prime Minister Naftali Bennett. They discussed trilateral relations, the Iran nuclear deal and the Russian invasion of Ukraine.

Turkey

Relations between Egypt and Turkey deteriorated significantly after Morsi's ousting. Recep Tayyip Erdoğan, then Prime Minister, was the only leader to call Morsi's ouster a coup, calling for the immediate release of Morsi and insisting he is the legitimate president of Egypt. Turkish Minister for European Affairs Egemen Bagis also called for the UN Security Council to "take action" in Egypt. Erdoğan was said not to recognise Sisi as president of Egypt and called him an "illegitimate tyrant" in response to the 2014 Israel–Gaza conflict and alleged Egyptian support for Israel in its war against Hamas. In response to Erdoğan's remarks, the Egyptian Foreign Ministry warned that the Egypt–Turkey relationship would be worsened while Sisi refused to respond. Egypt's foreign ministry accused Erdogan of provocation and interfering in Egypt's internal affairs. In November 2013, Egypt told the Turkish ambassador to leave the country, a day after Erdoğan called for Morsi to be freed. Relations with Ankara were also lowered to chargé d'affaires. The Egyptian foreign ministry also said that Egypt has cancelled joint naval drills with Turkey over Turkey's interference in Egypt's domestic affairs. In September 2014, Egypt's foreign minister cancelled a meeting with now-President Erdoğan requested by Turkey after Erdoğan made a speech critical of Egypt in the UN General Assembly. An advisor to the Turkish president denied that the countries' leaders were planning to meet. Sisi's administration also decided to cancel the "Roll-on/roll-off" agreement with Turkey, blocking Turkey from transporting Turkish containers to the Gulf via Egyptian ports. In 2014, an intense campaign started by Egypt and Saudi Arabia against Turkey made it lose its predicted easy victory of membership in the United Nations Security Council. In March 2021, Erdoğan said that Turkey was "keen on strengthening relations with Egypt." Egypt appreciated Turkey's comments, but said that Turkey must turn the chapter and start taking action. Turkey has ordered Muslim Brotherhood channels based in the country to calm criticism of Egypt and its president, or even completely stop it.

Arab world

Al Jazeera reported in June 2014: "Saudi Arabia, the world's top oil exporter, and its wealthy Gulf Arab partners Kuwait and the United Arab Emirates have given more than $20 billion to help Egypt since Morsi's overthrow, Sisi said last month, and are likely to pledge more." In 2015, Egypt participated in the Saudi Arabian-led military intervention in Yemen.

In April 2016, King Salman of Saudi Arabia made a five-day visit to Egypt, during which the two countries signed economic agreements worth approximately $25 billion and also made an agreement to "return" Tiran and Sanafir, two Egyptian-administered islands in the Gulf of Aqaba, to Saudi control. The announcement of the transfer of the islands provoked a backlash in both social media and traditional media, including outlets which had been firmly pro-Sisi. In January 2017, an Egyptian court gave its final ruling rejecting the controversial government transfer of the two islands to Saudi Arabia. The Supreme Constitutional Court froze that ruling and allowed Sisi to ratify the deal with Saudi Arabia, making these two islands included in Mohammed Bin Salman's NEOM megacity.

In November 2016, Sisi said that he supported the presidency of Bashar al-Assad in Syria for the sake of stability. In a February 2017 article in Foreign Affairs, Oren Kessler, the Deputy Director for Research at the Foundation for Defense of Democracies, suggests there are three reasons for Sisi's pro-Assad position: Egypt's common enemies with Syria (ISIS and the Muslim Brotherhood) as opposed to Saudi Arabia's antagonism with Iran; Egypt and Syria's shared opposition to the policies of President Erdoğan of Turkey; and Egypt's growing relations with Russia, a close ally of Syria. Kessler concludes that the sentiment of "revolution fatigue" amplifies Sisi's support for Assad.

On 24 June 2022, Sisi met with Qatar's Emir Tamim bin Hamad Al Thani on his first official visit to Egypt since 2015. They discussed diplomatic and economic relations after Qatar and Egypt had signed investments contracts worth more than US$5 billion in March 2022.

Russia

Both military and political relations between Egypt and Russia witnessed significant improvements after Morsi's overthrow coinciding with the deterioration in relations between the United States and Egypt, once considered its important ally in the Middle East. Unlike the US, Russia supported Sisi's actions from the start, including his presidential bid. Russia reportedly offered Egypt a huge military weapons deal after the US had suspended some military aid and postponed weapons delivery to Egypt. The Russian President Vladimir Putin was the first to congratulate Sisi on his inauguration. Sisi made Russia his first destination abroad as defense minister after being promoted to the rank of Field Marshal where he met with the Russian President Vladimir Putin and the Russian Minister of Defense General Sergey Shoygu to negotiate an arms deal with Russia instead of the United States. 

Sisi also visited Russia as an Egyptian President at the invitation of Russian President Vladimir Putin. The visit was described by Putin as reflective of "the special nature" of the relation between the two countries. Sisi was welcomed by General Sergey Shoygu who showed him different Russian-made military vehicles and weapons in the airport. Moscow's Vedemosti business daily reported that Russia and Egypt are nearing a $3 billion (2.2 billion euro) weapons agreement. President Putin also accompanied him to visit the Russian cruiser Moskva before they gave a joint televised statement. Sisi announced in his statement that there was a new plan of "renewing and developing" giant projects established by the former Soviet Union. President Putin announced that an agreement has been reached to increase Egypt's supply of agricultural goods to Russia by 30 percent while his country will provide Egypt with 5 to 5.5 million tons of wheat. In addition, a free trade zone was also being discussed.

On 11 December 2017, during President Vladimir Putin's visit to Cairo, the two countries signed agreements in which Russia would build Egypt's first nuclear reactor, and supply nuclear fuel for the same. It was also agreed that a "Russian Industrial Zone" would be built along the Suez Canal, explained by Putin as being "the biggest regional center for producing Russian products onto the markets of the Middle-East and North Africa."

United States

Relations between Egypt and the United States witnessed tensions after the overthrow of Mohamed Morsi. The United States strongly condemned Sisi's administration on several occasions before deciding to delay selling four F-16 fighter jets, Apaches and Abrams' kits to Egypt. The US also cancelled the Bright Star joint military exercise with the Egyptian Armed Forces. Sisi's administration purportedly showed unusual actions in dealing with the US, calling on President Barack Obama's administration to exercise restraint in dealing with "racially charged" unrest in Ferguson, echoing language the US used to caution Egypt previously as it cracked down on Islamist protesters. Egyptian security checked US Secretary of State John Kerry and his top aides through a stationary metal detector as well as with a handheld wand before meeting with el-Sisi in what was considered an unusual screening for a senior State Department official. Sisi also skipped Obama's invitation to the American-African summit.

Despite evidence of tensions, a 2014 news story, BBC reported: "The US has revealed it has released $575m in military aid to Egypt that had been frozen since the ousting of President Mohammed Morsi last year." In September 2014 Sisi visited the US to address the UN General assembly in New York. An extensive media campaign produced billboards which were distributed all over New York City, welcoming the Egyptian president. In August 2015, Secretary of State John Kerry was in Cairo for a "U.S.-Egypt strategic dialogue".

Following the election of Republican Donald Trump as the President of the United States, the two countries looked to improve the Egyptian-American relations. El-Sisi and Trump had met during the opening of the seventy-first session of the United Nations General Assembly in September 2016. The absence of Egypt in President Trump's travel ban towards seven Muslim countries was noted in Washington, although the Congress has voiced human rights concerns over the handling of dissidents. On 22 March 2017, it was reported that el-Sisi would be traveling to Washington to meet with Trump on 3 April 2017. President Trump praised el-Sisi, saying that el-Sisi had "done a tremendous job under trying circumstance". On 26 August 2019, Trump met with el-Sisi, along with other global leaders, in the 45th G7 summit in Biarritz, France. Trump continued his earlier praise of el-Sisi, saying that "Egypt has made tremendous progress under a great leader's leadership".

El-Sisi criticized President Donald Trump's decision to recognize Jerusalem as Israel's capital. According to el-Sisi, the Trump administration's decision "would undermine the chances of peace in the Middle East."
El-Sisi was praised by Trump.

Political opposition

In late 2019, there were numerous direct calls for el-Sisi to immediately resign.

In September 2019, building contractor Mohamed Ali, in exile in Spain, published videos online that directly criticised el-Sisi, claiming corruption and ineffectiveness. Ali's videos sparked off the September 2019 Egyptian protests, which el-Sisi responded to in several speeches. In response to the street protests calling for el-Sisi to resign, 4300 protestors and non-protestors were arrested.

In November 2019, member of the House of Representatives Ahmed Tantawi submitted a formal parliamentary proposal and a YouTube video online for el-Sisi to finish his term in 2022 rather than 2024, and for consultation on institutional reforms to take place, in order to allow change to take place by political methods.

On 28 December 2019, Mohamed Ali released the "Egyptian Consensus Document" with a list of four key principles and four key actions for replacing el-Sisi's system of government, which Ali claimed represented the consensus of a wide range of the Egyptian opposition. The following day, the Egyptian National Action Group (ENAG) including Ayman Nour as spokesperson was launched, with a similar claim of representing the consensus of a broad array of the Egyptian opposition ("centrists, liberals, leftists [and] Islamists") with a consensus program for replacing el-Sisi's governmental system.

Personal life
Unlike Hosni Mubarak, el-Sisi is protective of the privacy of his family, even though two of his sons hold positions in the government. He is married to his cousin Entissar Amer, and is the father of three sons and one daughter. One of his sons is married to the daughter of former Egyptian army chief Mahmoud Hegazy.

El-Sisi comes from a religious family and frequently quotes Quranic verses during informal conversations; El-Sisi's wife wears the hijab, though usually a casual kind that covers the hair but not the neck. El-Sisi is known to be quiet and is often called the Quiet General. Even as a young man he was often called "General Sisi" due to his perceived orderly demeanor.

According to Sherifa Zuhur, a professor at the War College, when el-Sisi attended, many American officers expressed doubts that Muslims could be democratic. El-Sisi disputed this opinion; he and others were critical of decisions made in Iraq and Libya. El-Sisi wrote his term paper at the War College on democracy and its applications in the Middle East. In his paper, he argues in favour of democracy based on its past successes. Zuhur also had the impression that el-Sisi supported a gradual move towards pluralism. While at the War College, Sisi sometimes led Friday prayers at the local mosque.

Sisi described himself as "a doctor whose diagnoses are sought after by top philosophers and prominent world leaders."

Recognition

Military

30 June 2013 Revolution Medal
25 January 2011 Revolution Medal
Silver Jubilee of Liberation of Sinai Medal (2007)
Golden Jubilee of 23 July 1952 Revolution (2002)
Silver Jubilee of October War 1973 Medal (1998)
Longevity and Exemplary Service Medal
October War 1973 Medal (1973)
Kuwait Liberation Medal
Kuwait Liberation Medal (Egypt)
Liberation of Sinai Decoration (1982)
Distinguished Service Decoration
Military Duty Decoration, Second Class
Military Duty Decoration, First Class
Military Courage Decoration
Republic's Military Decoration
Training Decoration
Army Day Decoration

Civil
: Collar of the Order of Sheikh Isa bin Salman Al Khalifa
: Medal of the Order of the Friendship of Peoples
: Grand Cross of the Order of Makarios III
 : Grand Cross of the Legion of Honour
: Medal of the Order of St. George from Semperoper (later withdrawn)
 : Grand Cross of the Order of the Redeemer 
 : Grand Cross of the National Order of Merit 
: Honorary PhD from National University of Public Service
 : Grand Cross of the National Order of the Ivory Coast
: Collar of the Order of Abdulaziz Al Saud 
: Collar of the Order of Mubarak the Great
: Grand Collar of the Order of Prince Henry
: First Class of the Order of the Republic of Serbia
: Collar of the National Order of Sudan
: Collar of the Order of Zayed
: Medal of Arab tourism

Publications
Written by Sisi when he was a Brigadier General:
"Democracy in the Middle East" (Archive). U.S. Army War College (USAWC) Strategy Research Project. Advised by Colonel Stephen J. Gerras. - Obtained through the U.S. Freedom of Information Act (FOIA) by Judicial Watch

See also

Politics of Egypt
Gamal Abdel Nasser
Post-coup unrest in Egypt (2013–2014)

Notes

References

Further reading
 Online version is titled "Egypt's Failed Revolution".

External links

State Information Service CV
Egyptian Armed Forces Commander-in-chief CV
El-Sisi is the new commander-in-chief of the Egyptian armed forces
 
On the future First Lady

|-

|-

|-

1954 births
2013 Egyptian coup d'état
21st-century presidents of Egypt
Chairpersons of the African Union
Beblawi Cabinet
Chiefs of staff
Defence Ministers of Egypt
Egyptian Muslims
Field marshals of Egypt
Living people
Members of the Supreme Council of the Armed Forces
Critics of Islamism
Politicians from Cairo
Qandil Cabinet
Leaders who took power by coup
El-Sisi family
Egyptian Military Academy alumni
Directors of the Military Intelligence and Reconnaissance (Egypt)
Military personnel from Cairo
20th-century Egyptian military personnel
Recipients of orders, decorations, and medals of Sudan